Samuel Ealy Johnson may refer to:

Samuel Ealy Johnson Jr. (1877–1937), Texas politician and father of U.S. President Lyndon Baines Johnson
Samuel Ealy Johnson, Sr. (1838–1915), grandfather of U.S. President Lyndon Baines Johnson, and honoree of Johnson City, Texas

See also
Samuel Johnson (disambiguation)